Histori me zhurmues is a show on Klan TV about communist histories.

References

Albanian television shows